Petr Ševčík (born 4 May 1994) is a professional Czech football player who currently plays for Slavia Prague and the Czech Republic national team.

Career
In January 2019, Petr Ševčík moved to Slavia Prague. On 18 April 2019, Ševčík scored a brace in the away second leg of the UEFA Europa League quarter-finals against Chelsea.

International career
He made his debut for Czech Republic national football team on 14 November 2019 in a Euro 2020 qualifier against Kosovo. He substituted Lukáš Masopust in the 76th minute.

Career statistics

Club

References

External links
 
 
 
 Petr Ševčík national team profile 
 
 

1994 births
Living people
People from Jeseník
Czech footballers
Czech Republic youth international footballers
Czech Republic under-21 international footballers
Czech Republic international footballers
Association football midfielders
Czech First League players
SK Sigma Olomouc players
SFC Opava players
FC Slovan Liberec players
SK Slavia Prague players
Czech National Football League players
UEFA Euro 2020 players
Sportspeople from the Olomouc Region